Serapias perez-chiscanoi is a species of orchid endemic to Portugal and western Spain.

References

perez-chiscanoi
Orchids of Europe
Plants described in 1990